Michael Higgins (born December 7, 1987) is a former American football tight end. He was signed by the New Orleans Saints as an undrafted free agent in 2011. He played college football at Nebraska-Omaha.

Professional career

New Orleans Saints
Higgins was signed as a free agent by the New Orleans Saints on July 27, 2011. He was waived on September 3, 2011, and re-signed to the team's practice squad.

Minnesota Vikings
He was signed by the Vikings on July 23, 2014 and was released on August 26.

References

External links
New Orleans Saints bio

1987 births
Living people
People from Beatrice, Nebraska
American football tight ends
Nebraska–Omaha Mavericks football players
New Orleans Saints players
Minnesota Vikings players
Sportspeople from Omaha, Nebraska